Yang Xiu is the name of:

Yang Xiu (Han dynasty) (175–219), advisor to Cao Cao
Yang Xiu (Sui dynasty) (c. 570–618), prince in Sui dynasty